The Catholic Church of all Korea is united under a single episcopal conference for the entire politically divided peninsula. All territorial jurisdictions in Korea are part of the Latin Church, covering both South Korea and North Korea, comprising:
 three ecclesiastical provinces, each headed by a metropolitan bishop seated in an archdiocese, and a total of 14 suffragan dioceses
 the Military Ordinariate of South Korea.
 the pre-diocesan Territorial Abbey of Tokwon, in North Korea

Latin provinces of Korea

Ecclesiastical Province of Seoul, including North Korea 
 Archdiocese of Seoul (also partially in North Korea)
Diocese of Chunchon (also partially in North Korea)
Diocese of Daejeon
Diocese of Hamhung (in North Korea)
Diocese of Incheon 
Diocese of Pyongyang (in North Korea)
Diocese of Suwon
Diocese of Uijeongbu
Diocese of Wonju

Ecclesiastical Province of Kwangju, in South Korea 
 Archdiocese of Gwangju 
 Diocese of Cheju (Jeju)
 Diocese of Jeonju

Ecclesiastical Province of Daegu, in South Korea 
 Archdiocese of Daegu 
Diocese of Andong
Diocese of Cheongju 
Diocese of Masan
Diocese of Busan

Exempt jurisdictions sui iuris 
 Military Ordinariate of (South) Korea
 Territorial Abbey of Tokwon (alias Tŏkugen abbey, with a cathedral see), in North Korea

Defunct jurisdictions 
There are no titular sees.

All former prelatures have current successor jurisdictions, notably as result of promotions.

Sources and external links 
 GCatholic.org.
 Catholic-Hierarchy entry.

Korea religion-related lists
Korea